Henrik Hagtvedt is a Norwegian visual artist (born 6 January 1971 in Sandefjord, Norway) working predominantly with acrylics and oils, as well as with sculpture, graphics and other media. In the years following his studies at the Accademia di Belle Arti in Florence, Italy, his work had a rapid rise to fame and was exhibited in a number of galleries in both Europe and Asia, ranging from the Museo Montelupo in Italy to the Cultural Foundation (national gallery) in the United Arab Emirates. Although he has painted in a variety of styles, from abstract to photo-realism, Henrik Hagtvedt is most famous for a thickly textured and highly expressive style which gained him a great deal of critical acclaim and media attention early in his career. It was presumably this style that earned him the nickname “The Northern Light,” first given to him in Italy. However, little time elapsed before Hagtvedt began declining exhibitions and distancing himself from the contemporary art scene, thus virtually disappearing from both the public eye and from mainstream art institutions, almost as suddenly as he had appeared upon the scene some years earlier.

Hagtvedt's sudden departure from the mainstream art scene coincided with a decision to conduct scientific research pertaining to, among other topics, the psychological impact of art and the intersection of art and marketing. After completing a PhD in Business Administration, he is now a marketing professor at Boston College. As a scholar, his main areas of expertise include art, aesthetics and luxury. His research appears in academic journals in disciplines such as marketing, psychology and neuroscience, and it has also received attention from the international press.

Notes

References 
Amendolara, Marco (2001) "Tinture disumane. Arte mista ad altro" Tesauro, Le Maschere
Centi, Patrizia (1996) "L'Arte Secondo Pablo Picasso Nella Mostra di Hagtvedt" La Nazione (April)
Chandran, Sudha (1999) "A Brush With Reality" Panorama (p. 20-21) (April 30 - May 6)
Corbett, Rachel (2008), “Striking Their Fancy,” ARTnews, 107 (6), 42.
Gregory, Sean (2009), "The Luxury-Brand Effect: Should BMW Sell Ketchup?" TIME, August 5, 
Gregory, Sean (2010), "Wrong Purchase? Why Shoppers Can't Stop Buying," TIME, December 22, 
Gulf News staff reporter (1999) "Norwegian Art Fest in Capital" Gulf News, May 14.
Hagtvedt artist website 
Hagtvedt faculty bio 
Hall, Ashley (2010), "Luxury Buys Linked to Unplanned Spending Sprees," ABC News, December 15 
Helm, Burt (2008), “Impressionists Impress Better,” BusinessWeek, March 3, 20.
Hindustan Times (2010), "Pretty Things Make You Spend More," December 17, 
Saran, Pracheer (1999) "Norwegian Art Show in Dubai" The Gulf Today (April 26)
Science Daily (2008), “Simple Recipe For Ad Success: Just Add Art,” 
Stemland, Jens Henrik (1996) "Suksess i Italia" VG, June 16.
Wallop, Harry (2010), "Christmas Shopping: How One Designer Good Starts a Habit," The Daily Telegraph, December 22, 

20th-century Norwegian painters
21st-century Norwegian painters
Norwegian male painters
1971 births
Living people
20th-century Norwegian sculptors
20th-century Norwegian male artists
21st-century Norwegian male artists